Qareh Qeshlaq (also Romanized as Qareh Qeshlāq; also known as Kara Kishlyg and Qara Qishlaq) is a village in Benajuy-ye Gharbi Rural District, in the Central District of Bonab County, East Azerbaijan Province, Iran. At the 2006 census, its population was 540, in 112 families.

References 

Populated places in Bonab County